Archaeogeryon is an extinct genus of crab from the Miocene, the type species in the genus is Archaeogeryon peruvianus. Despite the species name, the crab is only known from the Guadal Formation, Chile.

References 

Portunoidea
Miocene crustaceans
Miocene animals of South America
Neogene Chile
Fossils of Chile
Fossil taxa described in 1924